National Highway 548E, commonly referred to as NH 548E is a national highway in  India. It is a spur road of National Highway 48. NH-548E traverses the state Maharashtra in India.

Route 

Mhaswad, Piliv, Pandharpur.

Junctions  

  Terminal near Mhasvad.
  Terminal near Pandharpur.

See also 

 List of National Highways in India
 List of National Highways in India by state

References

External links 

 NH 548E on OpenStreetMap

National highways in India
National Highways in Maharashtra